The Jobs and Growth Act, 2012 (informally referred to as Bill C-45) (the Act) is an Act of the Parliament of Canada. It was passed in December 2012 from the second omnibus bill introduced by the Conservative government to implement its 2012 budget, following the passage of the Jobs, Growth and Long-term Prosperity Act in June 2012. Both bills attracted controversy both for their size (>450 pages each) and for the breadth of provisions contained that were not fiscally related.

Content of the Act

Reaction to Navigable Waters Protection Act changes
"The most contentious amendments to the bill were those to the Navigable Waters Protection Act, which remove thousands of lakes and streams from federal protection under that law. The Conservatives said the changes streamline regulation and remove red tape that held up projects along waterways under the guise that they would impede navigation. Opposition parties say it removes environmental oversight over some of Canada's most treasured lakes and rivers."

The Green Party argued that Division 18 of Part 4 of Bill C-45 "weakened Canadians’ historic right to navigate the lakes, rivers, and streams of Canada without being impeded by pipelines, bridges, power lines, dams, mining and forestry equipment, and more." They argue that a body of water not mentioned in Schedule 2 on page 424, would no longer be protected from resource development by Canada's first environmental law enacted in 1882, the Navigable Waters Protection Act. 

Amnesty International said "changes to the Canadian Environmental Assessment Act, the Fisheries Act, the Navigable Waters Protection Act, and the proposed Safe Drinking Water for First Nations Act have profound implications for the rights of Indigenous peoples as set out in treaties, affirmed in the constitution, and protected by international human rights standards."

Reaction to Indian Act changes

Former Prime Minister Paul Martin argued  that the government failed to consult First Nations about this movement towards [privatization] and that the majority of bands were against the change to voting procedures. Martin stated that there was no debate either in parliament or with First Nations on this issue that "the bands themselves must decide." He denounced the way in which it was "simply slipped it into a budget bill." 

Idle No More is a protest movement formed in reaction to Bill C-45 (Division 8 of Part 4) and other concerns regarding Indigenous treaty rights. 

Political scientist Tom Flanagan, who worked as advisor to Stephen Harper until 2004, argued that the modifications to voting and approval procedures in relation to proposed land designations in the Indian Act in (Division 8 of Part 4) would speed up approvals which would be advantageous to First Nations that want to lease portions of their reserves for shopping centres, industrial parks, residential developments, casinos, etc. Under the Indian Act changes to land designation for leasing "had to be approved by majority vote in a referendum or band meeting for which the quorum was a majority of members – in other words, approval by a majority of a majority. If, as usually happened, the quorum was not achieved, the Minister of Aboriginal Affairs could authorize a second meeting dispensing with the quorum." Flanagan argued that this two-stage process was both costly and time consuming.

External links

References

41st Canadian Parliament
Indigenous politics in Canada
Canadian federal legislation
Idle No More
2012 in Canadian law
Omnibus legislation